General Antônio de Sousa Neto (Rio Grande, 11 February 1801 – Corrientes, 2 July 1866) was a Brazilian military leader of the Riograndense Republic during the Ragamuffin War. On 20 September 1836, Neto declared the independence of the Riograndense Republic.

He was a famous abolitionist and fought for the release of the slaves who had fought during the revolution.

The general's story is depicted in the 2001 movie "Netto Perde sua Alma" (Netto Loses His Soul, surname in the archaic spelling) with the actors: Tiago Real, Werner Schünemann, Anderson Simões, Lisa Becker, Leticia Liesenfeld, Álvaro Rosa Costa, Fabio Neto, Laura Schneider, Marcia do Canto and João Máximo.

References

1801 births
1866 deaths
Brazilian abolitionists
People from Rio Grande do Sul
Culture in Rio Grande do Sul
Brazilian people of Portuguese descent
Brazilian rebels